Diarsia rubifera, the red dart, is a moth of the family Noctuidae. It is found from coast to coast and from central and southern Canada and the northern United States. In the east it occurs as far south as western North Carolina, and in the west it has been recorded from south-western Montana and south-western Colorado. It has been recently recorded from Tennessee.

The wingspan is about 29 mm. Adults are on wing from July to August.

External links
Bug Guide
Images
The Noctuinae (Lepidoptera: Noctuidae) of Great Smoky Mountains National Park, U.S.A.

Diarsia
Moths of North America
Moths described in 1875